Mandy Lee Cho (born 2 September 1982 in Sacramento County, California) is a Hong Kong beauty contestant and television personality.

Cho studied in San Francisco, United States. She went to Hong Kong in 2003 and competed in the 2003 Miss Hong Kong Pageant. A favorite at the start of the competition, she made it into the semifinals and won the Perfect Team Award. Then in August, she competed in the finals and beat favorites like Selena Li, Rabee'a Yeung, and Carrie Lee for the title. Later Cho appeared in TVB series including Split Second, Guts of Man, and The Charm Beneath. She also became the seventh contestant from Hong Kong to win the Miss Chinese International First Runner-up title.  Cho is also the second woman after Winnie Yeung (also from Hong Kong) to win the Miss Friendship title. The eventual winner of the 2004 Miss Chinese International title was Linda Chung.

In 2006, Cho completed her studies at the Gemological Institute of America in New York City and is now a Graduate Gemologist. She returned to Hong Kong in September 2006. Though she said she was working as a PR at a jewelry company when she first returned to Hong Kong, she is now working as an actress once more.

Filmography

TV series

Awards
 2000 Model Competition:
 Internet Popularity
Miss Hong Kong 2003:
 Miss Hong Kong 2003, Diamond Skin, Miss International Goodwill, Miss Figure Beauty, Perfect Group
Miss Chinese International 2004:
 First Runner up and Miss Friendship
TVB:
 Best Newcomer

References

External links
Official TVB Blog

|-

1982 births
Actresses from the San Francisco Bay Area
American emigrants to Hong Kong
American people of Hong Kong descent
Hong Kong film actresses
Hong Kong television actresses
Living people
Miss Hong Kong winners
People from Sacramento County, California
TVB actors
21st-century Hong Kong actresses
American born Hong Kong artists